The Tenth Ward Square is a  historic district in northeast Salt Lake City, Utah, United States that was listed on the National Register of Historic Places in 1977.

Description

The district includes Late Gothic Revival, Greek Revival, and Late Victorian architecture in four contributing buildings.

It includes an 1873 one-room Mormon meeting house, a c.1880 store with included residence, an 1887 school, and a 1909 chapel.  The store appears to be one of the first works of architect Richard K. A. Kletting.  The church, designed by the Ashton Brothers, is "known for its impressive stained glass window".

See also

 National Register of Historic Places listings in Salt Lake City

References

External links

Tenth Ward Lumber and Building Association minutes, 1890s

Buildings and structures completed in 1873
Buildings and structures in Salt Lake City
Gothic Revival architecture in Utah
Greek Revival church buildings in Utah
Historic districts on the National Register of Historic Places in Utah
National Register of Historic Places in Salt Lake City
Victorian architecture in Utah